Athabasca  (2021 population 2,759), originally named Athabasca Landing, is a town in northern Alberta, Canada. It is the centre of Athabasca County. It was known as Athabasca Landing prior to August 4, 1913.

History 

Of Cree origin.  Early spellings:  Araubaska (Peter Pond) and Athapescow (Arrowsmith).  Various interpretations of the meaning: "where there are reeds" (Douglas); "meeting place of many waters" (Voorhis).  Town was first called Athabasca Landing about 1889; name changed to Athabaska in 1904 and changed back to Athabasca in 1948.  The provisional district of Athabasca was established in 1882, embracing the northern parts of modern Alberta and Saskatchewan.

Unlike many other towns in Alberta, Athabasca predates the railway. It was the terminus of the Edmonton to Athabasca Landing trail. Athabasca lies on a southern protrusion of the Athabasca River. During the fur trade era, when rivers were the principal means of transportation, the Athabasca–Edmonton trail connected two different drainage basins. The Athabasca River flows north and is part of the Mackenzie River watershed, which leads to the Arctic Ocean. Edmonton lies across a height-of-land on the North Saskatchewan River in the Nelson River drainage basin, which empties into Hudson Bay. Edmonton was in Rupert's Land but not Athabasca. The trail allowed goods to be portaged back and forth between river systems. Once agricultural settlement occurred, the trail served a similar purpose. Eventually, road and rail links would trace the same path.

The North-West Mounted Police stationed officers at Athabasca Landing for the summer of 1892, due to increased traffic on the trail. Inspector D.M. Howard, and eight constables, built a permanent post in 1893.

A massive forest fire in August 1913 destroyed a good portion of the town, including 30 businesses. There was no loss of life. Rebuilding of the town began immediately.

The Athabasca Heritage Society put up signs through the downtown as well as along the riverfront that explain and depict the history. It has also published a historical walking tour that is available from the town office, library and visitor information centre.

Geography

Lakes 
Narrow Lake

Demographics 

In the 2016 Census of Population conducted by Statistics Canada, the Town of Athabasca recorded a population of 2,965 living in 1,194 of its 1,313 total private dwellings, a  change from its 2011 population of 2,990.

Education 

The town is home to Athabasca University, a major centre for distance education and the town's largest employer.

The town has three public schools under the jurisdiction of Aspen View Public School Division No. 78:
Whispering Hills Primary School (WHPS) – Kindergarten to Grade 3
Landing Trail Intermediate School (LTIS) – Grades 4 to 6
Edwin Parr Composite School (EPC) – Grades 7 to 12

Media 
Local news is provided by the Athabasca Advocate, an award-winning weekly newspaper. Athabasca's local radio station is 94.1 CKBA-FM, Boom.

Climate 
Athabasca experiences a humid continental climate (Köppen climate classification Dfb) that borders on a subarctic climate (Köppen Dfc).

Infrastructure

Health care 
Health care is provided at the Athabasca Healthcare Centre.

Notable people 
Bryan Mudryk – TSN TV personality
Jay Onrait – TSN TV personality
George Ryga – playwright, poet
Kay Heim – All-American Girls Professional Baseball Player

References

Alberta First – Athabasca Facts and Statistics

External links 

 
1905 establishments in Alberta
Hudson's Bay Company trading posts
Towns in Alberta